William Neville is the name of:

William Neville (representative) (1843–1909), US politician.
William Neville, Earl of Kent (c. 1405–1463)
William Neville (poet) (15 July 1497–c.1545)
William Neville (by 1532–1559 or later), MP for Chippenham (UK Parliament constituency)
Bill Neville, see Canadian federal election results in Eastern Ontario
William Neville (Lollard knight) (c. 1341–1391), MP for Nottinghamshire (UK Parliament constituency)

See also